Danylo Sapunov (patronymic: Володимирович; born 5 April 1982 in Zaporizhya), is a Kazakhstani (since 2002 till 2009) and Ukrainian (until 2002 and since 2010) professional triathlete. From 2008 to 2010, Danylo Sapunov was married to the Ukrainian triathlete Yuliya Yelistratova.

Career
He is a triple Olympic Games participant (Athens 2004: 17th for Kazakhstan; Beijing 2008: 21st for Kazakhstan; London 2012: 42nd for Ukraine). Sapunov also represented Kazakhstan at the Asian Games.

In the eleven years from 2000 to 2010, Sapunov took part in 95 ITU competitions and achieved 56 top ten positions, among which 13 gold medals. He was the best Ukrainian triathlete in the Men Olympic Ranking London 2012.

ITU competitions 
Unless indicated otherwise, the following competitions are triathlons and belong to the Elite category. The list is based upon the official ITU rankings and the athlete's Profile Page.

BG = the sponsor British Gas · DNF = did not finish · DNS = did not start

References

External links 
 Ukrainian Triathlon Federation Федерация триатлона Украины in Ukrainian

1982 births
Living people
Sportspeople from Zaporizhzhia
Ukrainian emigrants to Kazakhstan
Ukrainian male triathletes
Kazakhstani male triathletes
Olympic triathletes of Ukraine
Olympic triathletes of Kazakhstan
Triathletes at the 2004 Summer Olympics
Triathletes at the 2008 Summer Olympics
Triathletes at the 2012 Summer Olympics
Triathletes at the 2006 Asian Games
Asian Games medalists in triathlon
Asian Games bronze medalists for Kazakhstan
Medalists at the 2006 Asian Games